American singer Amy Grant has released 20 studio albums (including 5 Christmas albums), 11 compilation albums, 4 live albums, and 84 singles. Considered one of the pioneers in the contemporary Christian music genre, Grant was also the first major Christian artist to successfully cross over into the mainstream.

Amy Grant has sold over 30 million albums worldwide throughout her career, making her the Best Selling Contemporary Christian artist of all time. She has 17 No. 1 albums on Billboards Top Christian Albums, more than any other artists in history. She is also known as the "Queen of Christian Pop" and the "Queen of Christmas Music" by various media outlets. According to RIAA, she has sold 17 million certified albums in the United States while Billboard listed her as the 46th Top Christian Artist of the 2010s. Capitol Christian Music Group honored Grant with a special award in honor of one billion career global streams.

At the age of 15, Grant signed a record deal with Myrrh Records. A year later in 1977, she released her self-titled debut album, which sold over 50,000 copies in its first year, a high total at the time for a Christian artist. Her follow-up albums My Father's Eyes (1978) and Never Alone (1980) reached the No. 1 spot on the Christian Albums chart, and 1982's Age to Age became the first Christian album recorded by a solo artist to receive gold and platinum certifications from the Recording Industry Association of America (RIAA). The album spent a record 85 weeks atop the Christian Albums chart and was the only No. 1 album for the entire year of 1983.

Grant first experienced mainstream success with 1985's Unguarded, which became the first Christian album to yield a top 40 single on the Billboard Hot 100; the album was certified platinum by the RIAA. In 1986, Grant recorded her first No. 1 single on the Hot 100 with "The Next Time I Fall", a duet with Peter Cetera. Her 1988 album Lead Me On shipped with a gold certification, a first for a Christian album, but did not sell as well as Unguarded. However, it received substantial acclaim and is frequently cited by critics as the best Christian album of all time.

Grant's 1991 album Heart in Motion became the best-selling Christian album of all time, selling over six million copies. Its single "Baby Baby" marked Grant's second No. 1 single on the Hot 100, and it also charted in the top ten in Australia, Canada, Europe, and the UK. The album had five singles chart in the top 20 in the United States and Canada and was certified 5× platinum by the RIAA; it was also certified platinum in Australia, Canada, and Taiwan. Her 1994 album House of Love yielded two top 40 singles in the United States and three in Canada; it has been certified 2× platinum by the RIAA and platinum in Canada. Her albums Behind the Eyes (1997) and Legacy... Hymns and Faith (2002) have both been certified gold. Grant's most recent studio album, 2013's How Mercy Looks from Here, debuted at No. 12 on the Billboard 200 and was her sixteenth No. 1 album on the Christian Albums chart.

Grant is also known for her Christmas albums; her first, A Christmas Album, was released in 1983 as her fifth major release and has been certified platinum by the RIAA and gold in Canada. 1992's Home for Christmas, her eleventh major release and second Christmas album, peaked at No. 2 on the Billboard 200, Grant's highest-charting album on the chart, and has been certified 3× platinum by the RIAA and gold in Canada. With over 2.5 million copies sold in the United States as of December 2014, it ranks as one of the best-selling Christmas albums since Nielsen SoundScan began tracking album sales in 1991.

Albums

Studio albums

Christmas studio albums

Compilation albums

Live albums

Video albums

Singles

1970s–1980s

1990s

2000s–present

As featured artist

Other charting songs

Notes

General references

References

External links
 
 
 

Christian music discographies
Discographies of American artists
Pop music discographies